Muriel E. Mussells Seyfert (born Muriel Elizabeth Mussells, February 3, 1909 – November 9, 1997) was an American astronomer best known for discovering a "ring nebulae" (planetary nebulae) in the Milky Way while working at the Harvard College Observatory in 1936 as a human computer.

Early life
Muriel was born on February 3, 1909, in Danvers, Massachusetts, the daughter of George and Stella Mussells.

Scientific contributions
Mussells Seyfert was employed as a human computer at the Harvard College Observatory. By examining photographic plates taken at Harvard’s astronomical station at Bloemfontain, South Africa, she discovered three new ring nebulae in the Milky Way galaxy in the mid-1930s.

Artist 
After moving to Nashville, Tennessee with her husband, Muriel pursued painting and maintained her art studio in the observatory residence (which has since become known as Muriel’s Retreat in her honor). Two of her portraits, one of observatory namesake Arthur Dyer and another of her husband, the first observatory director Carl Keenan Seyfert, are located in the Dyer Observatory in a stairway leading up to the Seyfert Telescope.

On March 18, 1952, a one-night art show of her art work was held at the Ryman Auditorium in downtown Nashville.

Personal life
On May 20, 1935, Muriel married Carl Keenan Seyfert who was the founder and first director of Vanderbilt University's Dyer Observatory in Nashville, Tennessee, and the Seyfert galaxies and Seyfert's Sextet would later be named after him. The couple had two children.

Muriel's sister, Sylvia Mussells Lindsay, also worked as a Harvard computer and discovered the first dwarf galaxy, the Sculptor system. She married astronomer Eric Mervyn Lindsay.

References

1909 births
1997 deaths
American women astronomers
Harvard Computers
20th-century American women scientists
20th-century American scientists